Mount Bridger is a mountain,  high, along the south side of Pearl Harbor Glacier, situated  north-northeast of Conard Peak in the Cartographers Range, Victory Mountains, in Victoria Land. It was mapped by the United States Geological Survey from surveys and from U.S. Navy air photos, 1960–64, and named by the Advisory Committee on Antarctic Names for William D. Bridger, a U.S. Navy aviation machinist's mate and flight engineer on Hercules aircraft at Williams Field, Ross Island, on Operation Deep Freeze 1968.

References 

Mountains of Victoria Land
Borchgrevink Coast